Dr. José Antonio Dávila (October 7, 1898 – December 4, 1941) was a postmodern Puerto Rican  poet.

Life and career 
Dávila (birth name: José Antonio Dávila Morales ) was born and raised in Bayamon, Puerto Rico into a literary family; he received both his primary and secondary education here and went to high school in Santurce, San Juan.

Early years
In 1918, he enrolled in the University of Puerto Rico and later transferred to Thomas Jefferson University in Philadelphia where he studied medicine, earning his medical degree in 1924; after graduating he established a medical practice there.

He was married to Alma Blake with whom he had a son (José Antonio Dávila, Jr.). Dávila became fatally ill and had to abandon his medical practice. He was interned at the Saranac Lake Hospital in New York, but returned to Puerto Rico in 1930. He is now buried in the city's Porta Coeli Cemetery, next to his father.

Dávila became a poet and received an award from the Puerto Rican Institute of Culture for his poem Vendimia (1940). His main source of inspiration was his father, the poet and Mayor of Bayamón, Virgilio Dávila.

Written works 
Much of Dávila's work was published posthumously.  Besides Vendimia, his other works are:

 Los Motivos de Tristan ('The Motives of Tristan') (1957)
 Poemas (Poems) (1964)
 Almacen de Baratijas
 Carta de Recomendación "Señor: en breve llegará a tu cielo una   tímida y dulce viejecita ..."

Davila also wrote a biography of the Bayamonese musician and composer Mariano Feliú Balseiro.

Commemoration
The City of Bayamon has named a school and an avenue after him.

Notes

See also

List of Puerto Rican writers
List of Puerto Ricans
Puerto Rican literature

References

External links
General Library

1898 births
1941 deaths
People from Bayamón, Puerto Rico
Puerto Rican poets
Puerto Rican male writers
Thomas Jefferson University alumni
20th-century American poets
20th-century American male writers